Iskwew Air is a Canadian Airline based at Vancouver International Airport.

Iskwew Air was founded in 2018 by the airline’s CEO, Teara Fraser. The airline officially launched March 2019. Fraser has announced plans to enter the domestic Canadian passenger charter sector, as well as offering a scheduled passenger service. 

Iskwew Air promotes itself as a 100% Indigenous and woman-owned air company. The airline aims to boost accessibility for remote communities across the province, as well as boosting indigenous tourism. All operations will be in cooperation with the Indigenous Tourism Association of Canada.  

The airline's first partnership is with Homalco Wildlife & Cultural Tours based in Campbell River, where it will help provide remote nature tours.
On August 16th, 2021 the airline launch regular scheduled service between Vancouver International Airport (YVR) South Terminal to Qualicum Beach Airport.

Fleet 
As of July 2019, Iskwew Air operates the following aircraft:

Destinations 
Destinations in British Columbia as of August 26, 2021:

 Vancouver International Airport 
 Qualicum Beach Airport

The airline operates out of Vancouver International Airport (YVR), from the South Terminal.

References 

Airlines of Canada
Companies based in Richmond, British Columbia
2018 establishments in British Columbia